Frederick Carl "Fritz" Roeseler (October 1, 1897–July 18, 1985) was an American football end for the Racine Legion and the  Milwaukee Badgers of the National Football League (NFL) from 1922 to 1925. He played at the collegiate level at North Central University and Marquette.

Biography
Roeseler was born on October 1, 1897, in Milwaukee, Wisconsin. He died there on July 18, 1985.

References

1897 births
1985 deaths
Racine Legion players
Milwaukee Badgers players
Marquette Golden Avalanche football players
Players of American football from Milwaukee
North Central University alumni